Gael Hamke Bay is a large bay in King Christian X Land, East Greenland. Administratively it is part of the Northeast Greenland National Park zone.

The bay was named after a Dutch skipper that claimed to have discovered the bay in 1654.

Geography
The bay lies south of Wollaston Foreland, north of Home Foreland, and east of Clavering Island. Towards the west lie the Finsch Islands, where the bay narrows and becomes the Godthab Gulf. The Young Sound has its mouth in the north, between the eastern end of Clavering Island and the southern shore of Wollaston Foreland. Jackson Island lies to the southeast at the mouth of the bay.

References

External links
 Photo of drift ice - Getty images

Bays of Greenland